A gunner is a cocktail served in clubs, bars, golf clubs, especially those popular with expats, in Singapore, Hong Kong and other parts of the Far East and India formerly under British colonial rule. It consists of equal parts ginger beer and ginger ale with a dash of Angostura bitters and sometimes a measure of lime cordial or lemon juice. It is regarded as a non-alcoholic drink, although Angostura bitters is 44.7% alcohol by volume. It is noted for its refreshing qualities, especially in warm weather.

The gunner has been described as "the only real Hong Kong cocktail".

Related drinks (or possibly alternative names): Also known in Hong Kong as a "Gunners". Malawi shandy, rock shandy, Windermere, Lemon, Lime and Bitters.

References

Non-alcoholic drinks
Cocktails with Angostura bitters
Cocktails with ginger beer